Dhiraj Devshibhai Parsana  (born 2 December 1947) is an Indian former cricketer who played in two Test matches in 1979 against the touring West Indies side as an all-rounder. He represented Gujarat and Saurashtra in the Ranji Trophy.

References

1947 births
Living people
People from Rajkot
Cricketers from Gujarat
India Test cricketers
Indian cricketers
West Zone cricketers
Durham cricketers
Saurashtra cricketers
Gujarat cricketers
Railways cricketers
North Zone cricketers